Agonis flexuosa is a species of tree that grows in the south west of Western Australia.  It is easily the most common of the Agonis species, and is one of the most recognisable trees of Western Australia, being commonly grown in parks and on road verges in Perth.

The species is commonly known as Western Australian peppermint, Swan River peppermint or peppermint, and willow myrtle for its weeping habit.

The Noongar peoples know the tree as Wanil, Wonnow, Wonong or Wannang.

Description 
A. flexuosa occurs mainly as a small and robust tree, usually less than 10 metres tall, although it may grow to 15 metres.  It has fibrous brown bark, long narrow dull-green leaves, and tightly clustered inflorescences of small white flowers in the axes.  It grows in a weeping habit, and looks remarkably like the weeping willow from a distance. Leaves are narrow and reach a length of 150mm. It is most readily identified by the powerful odour of peppermint emitted when the leaves are crushed or torn.

It flowers between August and December. The fruit is a hard capsule, 3 – 4 mm across, with three valves containing many small seeds.

Taxonomy 

The genus name Agonis comes from the Greek agon, "a cluster", referring to the arrangement of the fruits.  The species name flexuosa is Latin for "full of bends", referring to the zig-zag course of the stem, which changes direction at each leaf node.  It was originally placed in the genus Leptospermum by Sprengel in 1819, but Schauer placed it in Agonis in 1844.

The two recognised varieties are,
 Agonis flexuosa var. flexuosa, found in coastal areas of the Southwest, common.
 Agonis flexuosa  var. latifolia, range restricted to West of Walpole to Cheyne Beach, also found at the Stirling Range.

Horticultural variants are probably derived from the widespread population, growing as shrubs or trees and perhaps being flowerless. Some commercially produced cultivars include Agonis ‘Belbra Gold’ and Agonis ‘Fairy Foliage’. The cultivar Agonis 'Nana' is a dwarf form that is commonly seen in Perth as a hedge.

Distribution and habitat 
Agonis flexuosa occurs in a subcoastal strip from just north of Perth, southward through the Swan Coastal Plain, then along the coast to outlying records east of Bremer Bay (34°23'S).

The habitat includes limestone heath, stable dunes, and sandy soils; usually inland from the coastline, and it also grows as an under-storey plant in Tuart forest.

Cultivation
The tree is used in mass plantings, such as street trees, and has been introduced to Rottnest and Garden Islands near its native region. Agonis flexuosa is an attractive garden or specimen tree in temperate climates. However, care must be exercised in selecting it for small areas, as in a yard setting. Quick growing, the tree produces a large amount of detritus and its trunk sometimes becomes large and disproportionate to the rest of the tree.

Typically there are few species that grow under flexuosa trees, as the leaf litter can suppress understorey species.

Flexuosa and var. Nana respond well to pruning and is often pruned back to its main trunk to promote new growth and to keep a tidy and dense canopy. Without pruning, the canopy can become thin. The species, in some circumstances - such as when grown on rocky, terraced terrain - can grow buttress roots, but seldom does in flat, sandy areas. Flexuosa trees can also have a twist or spiral effect in the bark of their main trunks that increases with age, usually evident in seedlings.

It is not a species that is used for Bonsai.

Uses
The Noongar peoples used the plant leaves as an antiseptic; sapling trunks were used as spear shafts and digging sticks.

References

 
 
 
 

flexuosa
Trees of Australia
Endemic flora of Southwest Australia
Trees of Mediterranean climate
Garden plants of Australia
Ornamental trees
Drought-tolerant trees